Peter Paige (born 1 March 1939) is an Australian judoka. He competed in the men's middleweight event at the 1964 Summer Olympics.

References

1939 births
Living people
Australian male judoka
Olympic judoka of Australia
Judoka at the 1964 Summer Olympics
Place of birth missing (living people)